Charles Watkin Williams-Wynn PC (9 October 1775 – 2 September 1850) was a British politician of the early- to mid-19th century. He held office in both Tory and Whig administrations and was Father of the House of Commons between 1847 and 1850.

Background and education
Born into an ancient and grand Welsh family, Williams-Wynn was the second son of Sir Watkin Williams-Wynn, 4th Baronet, by his second wife Charlotte Grenville, daughter of Prime Minister George Grenville. His great-great-grandfather Sir William Williams, 1st Baronet, served as Speaker of the House of Commons from 1680 to 1685. On his mother's side, he was the nephew of William Wyndham Grenville, 1st Baron Grenville and George Nugent-Temple-Grenville, 1st Marquess of Buckingham and the first cousin of Richard Temple-Grenville, 1st Duke of Buckingham and Chandos. Williams-Wynn was educated privately, at Westminster School and Christ Church, Oxford. He was called to the Bar, Lincoln's Inn, in 1798. At Westminster School Williams-Wynn became acquainted with the poet Robert Southey, whom he later supported financially.

Political career
In 1797 he was elected to parliament for the notorious rotten borough of Old Sarum, where he succeeded Richard Wellesley, 2nd Earl of Mornington. He resigned this seat in 1799, when he was elected for Montgomeryshire, which constituency he would represent for the next 51 years. 

During the French Revolutionary War Montgomeryshire had failed to raise a single unit of part-time unit Yeomanry Cavalry or Volunteer Infantry for home defence and internal security duties. After the shortlived Peace of Amiens broke down in 1803, Williams-Wynn overcame the apathy and the county rapidly two formed Troops of Yeomanry cavalry by August 1803. Williams-Wynn took command as Major-Commandant By 2 November this had expanded into a large force, the Montgomeryshire Volunteer Legion. In contemporary terminology a 'Legion' was an all-arms force, and soon after its formation the Montgomeryshire unit comprised three troops of Yeomanry cavalry each 40 strong, and 20 Companies of Volunteer infantry, with Watkins-Wynn as Lieutenant-Colonel-Commandant and commander of the legion's cavalry. The Volunteer Infantry were replaced by the Local Militia in 1808, but the cavalry troops carried on as the Montgomeryshire Yeomanry. These were disbanded in 1828, but in view of the disturbances in north-east Wales Williams-Wynn applied to reform the regiment in 1831. It saw service in 1838–39 during the Chartist riots. Williams-Wynn finally retired from the command in 1844 at the age of 77.

In 1806 he was appointed Under-Secretary of State for the Home Department in the Ministry of All the Talents led by his uncle Lord Grenville. He remained in this post until the government fell the following year. Williams-Wynn was an active member of parliament and considered an authority on the procedure of the House of Commons. This led him to be nominated for the post of Speaker of the House of Commons in 1817. However, he was defeated by Charles Manners-Sutton. During the late 1810s, Williams-Wynn was the leader of a group of MPs that tried to establish a third party in the House of Commons, acting on behalf of his cousin Lord Buckingham. However, the third party never materialised and the group instead joined the Tories.

In January 1822 Williams-Wynn was admitted to the Privy Council and appointed President of the Board of Control, with a seat in the cabinet, in the Tory government of the Earl of Liverpool. He remained in this post also in the administrations of George Canning and Lord Goderich. However, when the Duke of Wellington became Prime Minister in 1828, Williams-Wynn was not offered a position in the government.

This drove him into opposition, and when the Whigs came to power in November 1830 under Lord Grey, Williams-Wynn was appointed Secretary at War, although without a seat in the cabinet. He only remained in this post until April of the following year, and held no other position during the three remaining years of the Whig government. In 1834 the Tories returned to office under Sir Robert Peel, and Wynn was appointed Chancellor of the Duchy of Lancaster, but again was not a member of the cabinet. The Peel government fell already in April 1835 and Wynn never held office again. However, he was said to have thrice rejected the post of Governor-General of India. Wynn remained Member of Parliament for Montgomeryshire until his death, and from 1847 to 1850 he was Father of the House of Commons; at the time of his death, he was the final MP from the 18th century still in Parliament.

He was elected as the first president, from 1823 to 1841, of the Royal Asiatic Society of Great Britain and Ireland and as a Fellow of the Royal Society in 1827.

Family
Wynn married Mary Cunliffe, daughter of Sir Foster Cunliffe, 3rd Baronet and Harriet Kinloch, in 1806. They had seven children, two sons and five daughters. His eldest daughter Charlotte Williams-Wynn was a well-known diarist; his son, also named Charles, followed him into Parliament. Williams-Wynn died in September 1850, aged 74.

References

1775 births
1850 deaths
Chancellors of the Duchy of Lancaster
Members of the Parliament of the United Kingdom for English constituencies
Members of the Parliament of Great Britain for Welsh constituencies
Conservative Party (UK) MPs for Welsh constituencies
British MPs 1796–1800
UK MPs 1801–1802
UK MPs 1802–1806
UK MPs 1806–1807
UK MPs 1807–1812
UK MPs 1812–1818
UK MPs 1818–1820
UK MPs 1820–1826
UK MPs 1826–1830
UK MPs 1830–1831
UK MPs 1831–1832
UK MPs 1832–1835
UK MPs 1835–1837
UK MPs 1837–1841
UK MPs 1841–1847
UK MPs 1847–1852
Younger sons of baronets
Montgomeryshire Yeomanry officers
Fellows of the Royal Society
Presidents of the Royal Asiatic Society
Members of the Privy Council of the United Kingdom
Presidents of the Board of Control